Thierry Nevers (born 26 March 2002) is an English professional footballer who plays as a winger for Bradford City, on loan from West Ham United.

Career
A product of the Reading academy, Nevers joined West Ham United in May 2021 on a three year contract with an option for a further year.

On 18 August 2022 Nevers joined Newport County on loan for the duration of the 2022–23 season. Nevers made his debut for Newport on 21 August 2022 in the starting lineup for the 2–1 League Two win against Tranmere Rovers. He scored his first goal for Newport on 27 August 2022 in the 4-0 League Two win against Harrogate Town. He was released back to his parent club by Newport on 29 December 2022. 

On 10 January 2023 Nevers signed a loan deal with Bradford City until the end of the season.

Career statistics

References

External links

2002 births
Living people
English footballers
Sportspeople from Reading, Berkshire
Association football wingers
Reading F.C. players
West Ham United F.C. players
Newport County A.F.C. players
English Football League players
Black British sportsmen
Bradford City A.F.C. players